The Thunder Bay Limestone is a geologic formation in Michigan. It preserves fossils dating back to the Devonian period.

Fossil content

Vertebrates

Conodonts

Placoderms

Invertebrates

Brachiopods

Cnidarians

Echinoderms

Trilobites

See also

 List of fossiliferous stratigraphic units in Michigan

References

 

Devonian Michigan
Middle Devonian Series